{{Infobox comics creator
| name          = Frank Miller
| image         = FrankMiller JimLee DC's 2018PopUpShop2.jpg
| caption       = Miller at SXSW 2018
| birth_name    = 
| birth_date    = 
| birth_place   = Olney, Maryland, U.S.
| nationality   = American
| area          = Writer, penciller, inker, film director
| cartoonist    = y
| write         = y
| art           = 
| pencil        = y
| ink           = y
| edit          = 
| publish       = 
| letter        = y
| color         = 
| alias         = 
| notable works = The Dark Knight ReturnsBatman: Year OneDaredevilElektraWolverineRonin300Sin City Cursed
| awards        = Awards
| website       = frankmillerink.com
}}
Frank Miller (born January 27, 1957) is an American comic book writer, penciller and inker, novelist, screenwriter, film director, and producer known for his comic book stories and graphic novels such as his run on Daredevil, for which he created the character Elektra, and subsequent Daredevil: Born Again, The Dark Knight Returns, Batman: Year One, Sin City, and 300.

Miller is noted for combining film noir and manga influences in his comic art creations. "I realized when I started Sin City that I found American and English comics be too wordy, too constipated, and Japanese comics to be too empty. So I was attempting to do a hybrid". Miller has received every major comic book industry award, and in 2015, he was inducted into the Will Eisner Award Hall of Fame.

Miller's feature film work includes writing the scripts for the 1990s science fiction films RoboCop 2 and RoboCop 3, sharing directing duties with Robert Rodriguez on Sin City and Sin City: A Dame to Kill For, producing the film 300, and directing the big screen adaptation of The Spirit. Sin City earned a Palme d'Or nomination.

Early life
Miller was born in Olney, Maryland, on January 27, 1957, and raised in Montpelier, Vermont, the fifth of seven children of a nurse mother and a carpenter/electrician father. His family was Irish Catholic.

Career
Miller grew up a comics fan; a letter he wrote to Marvel Comics was published in The Cat #3 (April 1973). His first published work was at Western Publishing's Gold Key Comics imprint, received at the recommendation of comics artist Neal Adams, to whom a fledgling Miller, after moving to New York City, had shown samples and received much critique and occasional informal lessons. Though no published credits appear, he is tentatively credited with the three-page story "Royal Feast" in the licensed TV series comic book The Twilight Zone #84 (June 1978), by an unknown writer, and is credited with the five-page "Endless Cloud", also by an unknown writer, in the following issue (July 1978). By the time of the latter, Miller had his first confirmed credit in writer Wyatt Gwyon's six-page "Deliver Me From D-Day", inked by Danny Bulanadi, in Weird War Tales #64 (June 1978).

Former Marvel editor-in-chief Jim Shooter recalled Miller going to DC Comics after having broken in with "...a small job from Western Publishing, I think. Thus emboldened, he went to DC, and after getting savaged by Joe Orlando, got in to see art director Vinnie Colletta, who recognized talent and arranged for him to get a one-page war-comic job". The Grand Comics Database does not list this job; there may have been a one-page DC story, or Shooter may have misremembered the page count or have been referring to the two-page story, by writer Roger McKenzie, "Slowly, painfully, you dig your way from the cold, choking debris..." in Weird War Tales #68 (Oct. 1978). Other fledgling work at DC included the six-page "The Greatest Story Never Told", by writer Paul Kupperberg, in that same issue, and the five-page "The Edge of History", written by Elliot S. Maggin, in Unknown Soldier #219 (Sept. 1978). His first work for Marvel Comics was penciling the 17-page story "The Master Assassin of Mars, Part 3" in John Carter, Warlord of Mars #18 (Nov. 1978).

At Marvel, Miller settled in as a regular fill-in and cover artist, working on a variety of titles. One of these jobs was drawing Peter Parker, The Spectacular Spider-Man #27–28 (Feb.–March 1979), which guest-starred Daredevil. At the time, sales of the Daredevil title were poor but Miller saw potential in "a blind protagonist in a purely visual medium," he recalled in 2000. Miller went to writer and staffer Jo Duffy (a mentor-figure whom he called his "guardian angel" at Marvel) and she passed on his interest to editor-in-chief Jim Shooter to get Miller work on Daredevil's regular title. Shooter agreed and made Miller the new penciller on the title. As Miller recalled in 2008: 

Daredevil and the early 1980sDaredevil #158 (May 1979), Miller's debut on that title, was the finale of an ongoing story written by Roger McKenzie and inked by Klaus Janson. After this issue, Miller became one of Marvel's rising stars.

However, sales on Daredevil did not improve, Marvel's management continued to discuss cancellation, and Miller himself almost quit the series, as he disliked McKenzie's scripts. Miller's fortunes changed with the arrival of Denny O'Neil as editor. Realizing Miller's unhappiness with the series, and impressed by a backup story Miller had written, O'Neil moved McKenzie to another project so that Miller could try writing the series himself. Miller and O'Neil maintained a friendly working relationship throughout his run on the series. With issue #168 (Jan. 1981), Miller took over full duties as writer and penciller. Sales rose so swiftly that Marvel once again began publishing Daredevil monthly rather than bimonthly just three issues after Miller became its writer.

Issue #168 saw the first full appearance of the ninja mercenary Elektra—who became a popular character and star in a 2005 motion picture—although her first cover appearance was four months earlier on Miller's cover of The Comics Journal #58. Miller later wrote and drew a solo Elektra story in Bizarre Adventures #28 (Oct. 1981). He added a martial arts aspect to Daredevil's fighting skills, and introduced previously unseen characters who had played a major part in the character's youth: Stick, leader of the ninja clan the Chaste, who had been Murdock's sensei after he was blinded and a rival clan called the Hand.

Unable to handle both writing and penciling Daredevil on the new monthly schedule, Miller began increasingly relying on Janson for the artwork, sending him looser and looser pencils beginning with #173. By issue #185, Miller had virtually relinquished his role as Daredevil's artist, and he was providing only rough layouts for Janson to both pencil and ink, allowing Miller to focus on the writing.

Miller's work on Daredevil was characterized by darker themes and stories. This peaked when in #181 (April 1982) he had the assassin Bullseye kill Elektra, and Daredevil subsequently attempt to kill him. Miller finished his Daredevil run with issue #191 (Feb. 1983), which he cited in a winter 1983 interview as the issue he is most proud of; by this time he had transformed a second-tier character into one of Marvel's most popular.

Additionally, Miller drew a short Batman Christmas story, "Wanted: Santa Claus – Dead or Alive", written by Dennis O'Neil for DC Special Series #21 (Spring 1980). This was his first professional experience with a character with which, like Daredevil, he became closely associated. At Marvel, O'Neil and Miller collaborated on two issues of The Amazing Spider-Man Annual. The 1980 Annual featured a team-up with Doctor Strange while the 1981 Annual showcased a meeting with the Punisher.

As penciler and co-plotter, Miller, together with writer Chris Claremont, produced the miniseries Wolverine #1–4 (Sept.-Dec. 1982), inked by Josef Rubinstein and spinning off from the popular X-Men title. Miller used this miniseries to expand on Wolverine's character. The series was a critical success and further cemented Miller's place as an industry star.

His first creator-owned title was DC Comics' six-issue miniseries Ronin (1983–1984). In 1985, DC Comics named Miller as one of the honorees in the company's 50th-anniversary publication Fifty Who Made DC Great.

Miller was involved in a few unpublished projects in the early 1980s. A house advertisement for Doctor Strange appeared in Marvel Comics cover-dated February 1981. It stated "Watch for the new adventures of Earth's Sorcerer Supreme – - as mystically conjured by Roger Stern and Frank Miller!". Miller's only contribution to the series was the cover for Doctor Strange #46 (April 1981). Other commitments prevented him from working on the series. Miller and Steve Gerber made a proposal to revamp DC's three biggest characters: Superman, Batman, and Wonder Woman, under a line called "Metropolis" and comics titled "Man of Steel" or "The Man of Steel", "Dark Knight" and "Amazon". However, this proposal was not accepted.

Batman: The Dark Knight Returns and the late 1980s
In 1986, DC Comics released the writer–penciler Miller's Batman: The Dark Knight Returns, a four-issue miniseries printed in what the publisher called "prestige format"—squarebound, rather than stapled; on heavy-stock paper rather than newsprint, and with cardstock rather than glossy-paper covers. It was inked by Klaus Janson and colored by Lynn Varley.

The story tells how Batman retired after the death of the second Robin (Jason Todd) and, at age 55, returns to fight crime in a dark and violent future. Miller created a tough, gritty Batman, referring to him as "The Dark Knight" based upon his being called the "Darknight Detective" in some 1970s portrayals, although the nickname "Dark Knight" for Batman dates back to 1940.The term appears on page seven of the story "The Joker" from Batman No. 1 (1940), which is reprinted in the book Batman Chronicles, Volume One (2005). In the lower right panel, Batman is shown swimming in the water after having been knocked off a bridge by the Joker, and the caption reads "THE SHOCK OF COLD WATER QUICKLY REVIVES THE DARK KNIGHT!" Released the same year as Alan Moore's and Dave Gibbons' DC miniseries Watchmen, it showcased a new form of more adult-oriented storytelling to both comics fans and a crossover mainstream audience. The Dark Knight Returns influenced the comic-book industry by heralding a new wave of darker characters. The trade paperback collection proved to be a big seller for DC and remains in print.

By this time, Miller had returned as the writer of Daredevil. Following his self-contained story "Badlands", penciled by John Buscema, in #219 (June 1985), he co-wrote #226 (Jan. 1986) with departing writer Dennis O'Neil. Then, with artist David Mazzucchelli, he crafted a seven-issue story arc that, like The Dark Knight Returns, similarly redefined and reinvigorated its main character. The storyline, "Daredevil: Born Again", in #227–233 (Feb.-Aug. 1986) chronicled the hero's Catholic background and the destruction and rebirth of his real-life identity, Manhattan attorney Matt Murdock, at the hands of Daredevil's nemesis, the crime lord Wilson Fisk, also known as the Kingpin. After completing the "Born Again" arc, Frank Miller intended to produce a two-part story with artist Walt Simonson but it was never completed and remains unpublished.

Miller and artist Bill Sienkiewicz produced the graphic novel Daredevil: Love and War in 1986. Featuring the character of the Kingpin, it indirectly bridges Miller's first run on Daredevil and Born Again by explaining the change in the Kingpin's attitude toward Daredevil. Miller and Sienkiewicz also produced the eight-issue miniseries Elektra: Assassin for Epic Comics. Set outside regular Marvel continuity, it featured a wild tale of cyborgs and ninjas, while expanding further on Elektra's background. Both of these projects were critically well received. Elektra: Assassin was praised for its bold storytelling, but neither it nor Daredevil: Love and War had the influence or reached as many readers as Dark Knight Returns or Born Again.

Miller's final major story in this period was in Batman issues 404–407 in 1987, another collaboration with Mazzucchelli. Titled Batman: Year One, this was Miller's version of the origin of Batman in which he retconned many details and adapted the story to fit his Dark Knight continuity. Proving to be hugely popular, this was as influential as Miller's previous work. A trade paperback released in 1988 remains in print, and is one of DC's best selling books. The story was adapted as an original animated film video in 2011.

Miller also illustrated the covers for the first twelve issues of First Comics' English-language reprints of Kazuo Koike and Goseki Kojima's Lone Wolf and Cub. This helped bring Japanese manga to a wider Western audience.

During this time, Miller (along with Marv Wolfman, Alan Moore, and Howard Chaykin) had been in dispute with DC Comics over a proposed ratings system for comics. Disagreeing with what he saw as censorship, Miller refused to do any further work for DC, and he took his future projects to the independent publisher Dark Horse Comics. From then on Miller was a major supporter of creator rights and became a major voice against censorship in comics.

The 1990s: Sin City and 300
After announcing he intended to release his work only via the independent publisher Dark Horse Comics, Miller completed one final project for Epic Comics, the mature-audience imprint of Marvel Comics. Elektra Lives Again was a fully painted graphic novel written and drawn by Miller and colored by longtime partner Lynn Varley. Telling the story of the resurrection of Elektra from the dead and Daredevil's quest to find her, as well as showing Miller's will to experiment with new story-telling techniques.

1990 saw Miller and artist Geof Darrow start work on Hard Boiled, a three-issue miniseries. The title, a mix of violence and satire, was praised for Darrow's highly detailed art and Miller's writing.

At the same time Miller and artist Dave Gibbons produced Give Me Liberty, a four-issue miniseries for Dark Horse. Give Me Liberty was followed by sequel miniseries and specials expanding on the story of protagonist Martha Washington, an African-American woman in modern and near-future North America, all of which were written by Miller and drawn by Gibbons.

Miller also wrote the scripts for the science fiction films RoboCop 2 and RoboCop 3, about a police cyborg. Neither was critically well received. In 2007, Miller stated that "There was a lot of interference in the writing process. It wasn't ideal. After working on the two Robocop movies, I really thought that was it for me in the business of film." Miller came into contact with the fictional cyborg once more, writing the comic-book miniseries RoboCop Versus The Terminator, with art by Walter Simonson. In 2003, Miller's screenplay for RoboCop 2 was adapted by Steven Grant for Avatar Press's Pulsaar imprint. Illustrated by Juan Jose Ryp, the series is called Frank Miller's RoboCop and contains plot elements that were divided between RoboCop 2 and RoboCop 3.

In 1991, Miller started work on his first Sin City story. Serialized in Dark Horse Presents #51–62, it proved to be another success, and the story was released in a trade paperback. This first Sin City "yarn" was rereleased in 1995 under the name The Hard Goodbye. Sin City proved to be Miller's main project for much of the remainder of the decade, as Miller told more Sin City stories within this noir world of his creation, in the process helping to revitalize the crime comics genre. Sin City proved artistically auspicious for Miller and again brought his work to a wider audience without comics. Miller lived in Los Angeles, California in the 1990s, which influenced Sin City. He later lived in the Hell's Kitchen neighborhood of New York City, which was also an influence.Daredevil: The Man Without Fear was a five issue miniseries published by Marvel Comics in 1993. In this story, Miller and artist John Romita Jr. told Daredevil's origins differently from in the previous comics, and they provided additional detail to his beginnings. Miller also returned to superheroes by writing issue #11 of Todd McFarlane's Spawn, as well as the Spawn/Batman crossover for Image Comics.

In 1994, Miller became one of the founding members of the comic imprint Legend, under which many of his Sin City works were released via Dark Horse Comics. In 1995, Miller and Darrow collaborated again on Big Guy and Rusty the Boy Robot, published as a two-part miniseries by Dark Horse. In 1999 it became an animated series on Fox Kids.

Written and illustrated by Frank Miller with painted colors by Varley, 300 was a 1998 comic-book miniseries, released as a hardcover collection in 1999, retelling the Battle of Thermopylae and the events leading up to it from the perspective of Leonidas of Sparta. 300 was particularly inspired by the 1962 film The 300 Spartans, a movie that Miller watched as a young boy.

Batman: The Dark Knight Strikes Again and 2000–2019
He was one of the artists on the Superman and Batman: World's Funnest one-shot written by Evan Dorkin published in 2000. Miller moved back to Hell's Kitchen by 2001 and was creating Batman: The Dark Knight Strikes Again as the 9/11 terrorist attacks occurred about four miles from that neighborhood. His differences with DC Comics put aside, he saw the sequel initially released as a three-issue miniseries, and though it sold well, it received a mixed to negative reception. Miller also returned to writing Batman in 2005, taking on the writing duties of All Star Batman & Robin, the Boy Wonder, a series set inside of what Miller describes as the "Dark Knight Universe," and drawn by Jim Lee. All Star Batman & Robin, the Boy Wonder also received largely negative reviews.

Miller's previous attitude towards movie adaptations was to change after Robert Rodriguez made a short film based on a story from Miller's Sin City entitled "The Customer is Always Right". Miller was pleased with the result, leading to him and Rodriguez directing a full-length film, Sin City using Miller's original comics panels as storyboards. The film was released in the U.S. on April 1, 2005. The film's success brought renewed attention to Miller's Sin City projects. Similarly, a 2006 film adaptation of 300, directed by Zack Snyder, brought new attention to Miller's original comic book work. A sequel to the film, Sin City: A Dame to Kill For, based on Miller's second Sin City series and co-directed by Miller and Robert Rodriguez, was released in theaters on August 22, 2014.

On July 10, 2015, at the San Diego Comic-Con, Miller was inducted into the Eisner Awards Hall of Fame.

From 2015 to 2017, DC released a nine-issue, bimonthly sequel to The Dark Knight Returns and The Dark Knight Strikes Again, titled The Dark Knight III: The Master Race. Miller co-wrote it with Brian Azzarello, and Andy Kubert and Klaus Janson were the artists. Issue one was the top-selling comic of November 2015, moving an estimated 440,234 copies. In 2016, Miller and Azzarello also co-wrote the graphic novel, The Dark Knight Returns: The Last Crusade with art by John Romita Jr. and Peter Steigerwald.

From April to August 2018, Dark Horse Comics published monthly Miller's five-issue miniseries sequel to 300, Xerxes: The Fall of the House of Darius and the Rise of Alexander, which marked his first work as both writer and artist comics creation since Holy Terror.

In 2017 Miller announced he was writing a Superman: Year One project with artwork by John Romita Jr. The three-issue series was released by DC Black Label from June to October 2019 and received mixed reviews.

Simon & Schuster Children's Publishing published his and author Tom Wheeler's young-adult novel Cursed, about the King Arthur legend from the point of view of the Lady of the Lake in October 2019.

In December 2019, DC released Dark Knight Returns: The Golden Child, the fifth series in The Dark Knight Returns universe to mixed reviews. It is written by Miller with artwork by Rafael Grampa.

The 2020s
In July 2020, Netflix released a 10-episode series based on Cursed with Miller and Wheeler serving as both creators and executive producers.

On April 28, 2022, it was reported that Miller was launching an American comic book publishing company titled Frank Miller Presents, or FMP. Miller will act as the company's president and editor-in-chief, working alongside Dan DiDio as publisher and chief operating officer Silenn Thomas. FMP expects to produce between two and four titles per year, with Miller's initial contributions to include Sin City 1858 and Ronin Book Two.

Legal issues
In October 2012, Joanna Gallardo-Mills, who began working for Miller as an executive coordinator in November 2008, filed suit against Miller in Manhattan for discrimination and "mental anguish", stating that Miller's former girlfriend, Kimberly Cox, created a hostile work environment for Gallardo-Mills in Miller and Cox's Hell's Kitchen living and work space.

In July 2020, producer Stephen L'Heureux, who worked on Sin City: A Dame to Kill For, filed a $25 million defamation and economic interference lawsuit against Miller and fellow producer Silenn Thomas. L'Heureux alleged the pair had repeatedly made, "false, misleading and defamatory statements" about L'Heureux's ownership of the developmental rights of Sin City and Hard Boiled to Skydance Media CEO David Ellison and other Skydance executives and prevented the creation of a film adaptation of Hard Boiled and a TV series based on Sin City. Miller's attorney Allen Grodsky denied the allegation stating, "The claims asserted in Mr. L'Heureux's lawsuit are baseless, and we will be aggressively defending this lawsuit."

Controversies

In July 2011, while at San Diego Comic-Con promoting his upcoming graphic novel Holy Terror, in which the protagonist hero fights Al-Qaeda terrorists, Miller made a remark about Islamic terrorism and Islam, saying, "I was raised Catholic and I could tell you a lot about the Spanish Inquisition, but the mysteries of the Catholic Church elude me. And I could tell you a lot about Al-Qaeda, but the mysteries of Islam elude me too."

In November 2011, Miller posted remarks pertaining to the Occupy Wall Street movement on his blog, calling it "nothing but a pack of louts, thieves, and rapists, fed by Woodstock-era nostalgia and putrid false righteousness." He said of the movement, "Wake up, pond scum. America is at war against a ruthless enemy. Maybe, between bouts of self-pity and all the other tasty tidbits of narcissism you've been served up in your sheltered, comfy little worlds, you've heard terms like al-Qaeda and Islamicism." Miller's statement generated controversy. In a 2018 interview, Miller backed away from his comments saying that he "wasn't thinking clearly" when he made them and alluded to a very dark time in his life during which they were made.

Personal life
Miller was married to colorist Lynn Varley from 1986 to 2005. She colored many of his most acclaimed works (from Ronin in 1984 through 300 in 1998) and the backgrounds to the 2006 movie 300.

Miller has been romantically linked to New York-based Shakespearean scholar Kimberly Halliburton Cox, who had a cameo in The Spirit (2008).

In response to claims that his comics are conservative, Miller said, "I'm not a conservative. I'm a libertarian."

Style and influence

Although still conforming to traditional comic book styles, Miller infused his first issue of Daredevil with his own film noir style. Miller sketched the roofs of New York in an attempt to give his Daredevil art an authentic feel not commonly seen in superhero comics at the time. One journalist noted,Ronin shows some of the strongest influences of manga and bande dessinée on Miller's style, both in the artwork and narrative style. Sin City was drawn in black and white to emphasize its film noir origins. Miller has said he opposes naturalism in comic art: "People are attempting to bring a superficial reality to superheroes which is rather stupid. They work best as the flamboyant fantasies they are. I mean, these are characters that are broad and big. I don't need to see sweat patches under Superman's arms. I want to see him fly."

Miller considers the renowned Argentinian comic book artist Alberto Breccia as one of his personal mentors, even declaring that (regarding modernity in comics), "It all started with Breccia". In that same regard, Miller's work in Sin City has been analyzed by South American writers and artists –as well as European critics like Yexus– as being based or inspired in Breccia's groundbreaking style,"Interviews: Eduardo Risso", in Comiqueando #22, by Andrés Accorsi. Comiqueando Press, Buenos Aires (VII-1996) Tebeosfera.com  especially regarding the latter's chiaroscuros and strong use of stark black-and-white technique.

Praise and criticismDaredevil: Born Again and The Dark Knight Returns were both critical successes and influential on subsequent generations of creators to the point of being considered classics of the medium. Batman: Year One was also met with praise for its gritty style, while comics including Ronin, 300 and Sin City were also successful, cementing Miller's place as a legend of comic books. However, later material such as Batman: The Dark Knight Strikes Again received mixed reviews. In particular, All Star Batman and Robin the Boy Wonder was widely considered a sign of Miller's creative decline.Biggers, Cliff. Comic Shop News #1064, November 7, 2007

Fellow comic book writer Alan Moore has described Miller's work from Sin City-onward as homophobic and misogynistic, despite praising his early Batman and Daredevil material. Moore previously penned a flattering introduction to an early collected edition of The Dark Knight Returns, and the two have remained friends. Moore has praised Miller's realistic use of minimal dialogue in fight scenes, which "move very fast, flowing from image to image with the speed of a real-life conflict, unimpeded by the reader having to stop to read a lot of accompanying text".

Miller's graphic novel Holy Terror was accused of being anti-Islamic. Miller later said that he regretted Holy Terror, saying, "I don't want to wipe out chapters of my own biography. But I'm not capable of that book again."

Miller's film adaptation of Sin City was well received by audiences and critics. On the review aggregator Rotten Tomatoes, the film holds an approval rating of 77% based on 254 reviews, with an average rating of 7.50/10. The website's critical consensus reads: "Visually groundbreaking and terrifically violent, Sin City brings the dark world of Frank Miller's graphic novel to vivid life."

His 2008 adaptation of The Spirit received negative reviews, earning a Rotten Tomatoes approval rating of 14% based on 111 reviews, with an average rating of 3.58/10, Metacritic gave it an aggregate score of 30 out of 100, based on 24 critics, indicating "generally negative reviews". and a metascore of 30/100 at Metacritic.com.

Awards and nominations
Inkpot Awards
 Received an Inkpot Award – 1981

Kirby Awards
Best Single Issue –
 1986 Daredevil #227 "Apocalypse" (Marvel)
 1987 Batman: The Dark Knight Returns #1 "The Dark Knight Returns" (DC)
Best Writer/Artist (single or team) – 1986 Frank Miller and David Mazzucchelli, for Daredevil: Born Again (Marvel)
Best Graphic Album, 1987 Batman: The Dark Knight Returns (DC)
Best Art Team – 1987 Frank Miller, Klaus Janson and Lynn Varley, for Batman: The Dark Knight Returns (DC)

Eisner Awards
Best Writer/Artist —
 1991 for Elektra Lives Again (Marvel)
 1993 for Sin City (Dark Horse)
 1999 for 300 (Dark Horse)
Best Graphic Album: New – 1991 Elektra Lives Again (Marvel)
Best Finite Series/Limited Series —
 1991 Give Me Liberty (Dark Horse)
 1995 Sin City: A Dame to Kill For (Dark Horse/Legend)
 1996 Sin City: The Big Fat Kill (Dark Horse/Legend)
 1999 300 (Dark Horse)
Best Graphic Album: Reprint —
 1993 Sin City (Dark Horse)
 1998 Sin City: That Yellow Bastard (Dark Horse)
Best Artist/Penciller/Inker or Penciller/Inker Team – 1993 for Sin City (Dark Horse)
Best Short Story – 1995 "The Babe Wore Red", in Sin City: The Babe Wore Red and Other Stories (Dark Horse/Legend)
Eisner Awards Hall Of Fame, 2015

Harvey Awards
Best Continuing or Limited Series –
 1996 Sin City (Dark Horse)
 1999 300 (Dark Horse)
Best Graphic Album of Original Work – 1998 Sin City: Family Values (Dark Horse)
Best Domestic Reprint Project – 1997 Batman: The Dark Knight Returns, 10th Anniversary Edition (DC)

Eagle Awards
 Favourite Comicbook Penciler — 1983
 Favourite Comicbook Writer: U.S. — 1986
 Roll of Honour — 1987
 Favourite Comicbook Penciler — 1987
 Favourite Comic Album: U.S. — 1987 Batman: The Dark Knight Returns (DC)
 Favourite Cover: U.S. — 1987 Batman: The Dark Knight Returns #1 (DC)
 Favourite Comic Album: US — 1988 Daredevil: Love and War (DC)
 Favourite Black & White Comicbook — 2000 Hell and Back (A Sin City Love Story) (Dark Horse)
 Favourite Comics Writer/Artist — 2002
 Favourite Comics-Related Book — 2006 Eisner/Miller (Dark Horse)
 Favourite Comics Writer/Artist — 2012

UK Comic Art Award
 Best Original Graphic Novel/One-Shot — 1991 Elektra Lives Again (Epic Comics)
 Best Writer/Artist — 1992
 Best Writer/Artist — 1993
 Best Graphic Novel Collection — 1993 Sin City Best Writer/Artist — 1994

Cannes Film Festival
Palme d'Or – 2005 (nominated) Sin City (Dimension Films)

Scream Awards
The Comic-Con Icon Award – 2006

Bibliography

DC ComicsWeird War Tales (a):
 "Deliver Me from D-Day" (with Wyatt Gwyon, in #64, 1978)
 "The Greatest Story Never Told" (with Paul Kupperberg, in #68, 1978)
 "The Day After Doomsday" (with Roger McKenzie, in #68, 1978)Unknown Soldier #219: "The Edge of History" (a, with Elliot S. Maggin, 1978)
Batman:Batman: The Greatest Stories Ever Told Volume 1 (tpb, 192 pages, 2005) includes:
 DC Special Series #21: "Wanted: Santa Claus—Dead or Alive!" (a, with Dennis O'Neil, 1979)Absolute Dark Knight (hc, 512 pages, 2006) collects:
 Batman: The Dark Knight Returns (w/a, 1986)
 Batman: The Dark Knight Strikes Again  (w/a, 2001)The Dark Knight III: The Master Race (w, with Brian Azzarello and Andy Kubert, 2015–2017)The Dark Knight Returns: The Last Crusade (w, with Brian Azzarello and John Romita Jr., 2016)Dark Knight Returns: The Golden Child (w, with Rafael Grampá and Jordie Bellaire, 2019)Batman: Year One (hc, 144 pages, 2005, ; tpb, 2007) collects:
 Batman #404–407 (w, with David Mazzucchelli, 1987)All Star Batman & Robin, the Boy Wonder #1–10 (w, with Jim Lee, 2005–2008)
 Issues #1–9 collected as Volume 1 (hc, 240 pages, 2008, ; tpb, 2009)Ronin (w/a, 1983) collected as Ronin (tpb, 302 pages, 1987, ; hc, 328 pages, 2008)Superman #400: "The Living Legends of Superman" (a, with Elliot S. Maggin, among other artists, 1984)Fanboy #5 (a, with Mark Evanier, among other artists, 1999) collected in Fanboy (tpb, 144 pages, 2001)Superman and Batman: World's Funnest: "Last Imp Standing!" (a, with Evan Dorkin, among other artists, one-shot, 2000)Orion #3: "Tales of the New Gods: Nativity" (a, with Walt Simonson, 2000) collected in O: The Gates of Apokolips (tpb, 144 pages, 2001)Superman: Year One #1–3 (w, with John Romita Jr., 2019)

Marvel ComicsJohn Carter, Warlord of Mars #18: "Meanwhile, Back in Helium!" (a, with Chris Claremont, 1978) collected in Edgar Rice Burroughs' John Carter, Warlord of Mars (tpb, 632 pages, Dark Horse, 2011) and John Carter, Warlord of Mars Omnibus (hc, 624 pages, 2012)The Complete Frank Miller Spider-Man (hc, 208 pages, 2002) collects:The Spectacular Spider-Man #27–28 (a, with Bill Mantlo, 1979)The Amazing Spider-Man Annual #14–15 (a, with Dennis O'Neil, 1980–1981)Marvel Team-Up:
 "Introducing: Karma!" (w/a, with Chris Claremont, in #100, 1980)
 "Power Play!" (w, with Herb Trimpe, in Annual #4, 1981)Marvel Two-in-One #51: "Full House—Dragons High!" (a, with Peter B. Gillis, 1979) collected in Essential Marvel Two-in-One Volume 2 (tpb, 568 pages, 2007)Daredevil:Daredevil by Frank Miller & Klaus Janson Omnibus (hc, 840 pages, 2007) collects:
 "A Grave Mistake" (a, with Roger McKenzie, in #158, 1979)
 "Marked for Death" (a, with Roger McKenzie, in #159–161, 1979–1980)
 "Blind Alley" (a, with Roger McKenzie, in #163, 1980)
 "Exposé" (a, with Roger McKenzie, in #164, 1980)
 "Arms of the Octopus" (w/a, with Roger McKenzie, in #165, 1980)
 "Till Death Do Us Part!" (w/a, with Roger McKenzie, in #166, 1980)
 "...The Mauler!" (a, with David Michelinie, in #167, 1980)
 "Elektra" (w/a, in #168, 1981)
 "Devils" (w/a, in #169, 1980)
 "Gangwars" (w/a, in #170–172, 1981)
 "The Assassination of Matt Murdock" (w/a, in #173–175, 1981)
 "Hunters" (w/a, in #176–177, 1981)
 "Paper Chase" (w/a, in #178–180, 1982)
 "Last Hand" (w/a, in #181–182, 1982)
 "Child's Play" (w/a, with Roger McKenzie, in #183–184, 1982)
 "Guts & Stilts" (w, with Klaus Janson, in #185–186, 1982)
 "Widow's Bite" (w, with Klaus Janson, in #187–190, 1982–1983)
 "Roulette" (w/a, in #191, 1983)What If? #28: "What If Daredevil became an agent of SHIELD" (w/a, in What If? #28, 1981)Daredevil Omnibus Companion (hc, 608 pages, 2008) includes:
 "Badlands" (w, with John Buscema, in #219, 1985)
 "Warriors" (w, with Dennis O'Neil and David Mazzucchelli, in #226, 1986)
 "Born Again" (w, with David Mazzucchelli, in #227–233, 1986)
 Daredevil: Love and War (w, with Bill Sienkiewicz, graphic novel, tpb, 64 pages, 1986)
 Daredevil: The Man Without Fear (w, with John Romita Jr., 1993)What If? #34: "What If Daredevil Were Deaf Instead of Blind?" (w/a, 1 page in What If? #34, 1982)Elektra by Frank Miller & Bill Sienkiewicz  (hc, 400 pages, 2008) collects:
 "Untitled" (w/a, in Bizarre Adventures #28, 1981)What If? #35: "What If Bullseye Had Not Killed Elektra?" (w/a, in What If? #35, 1982)
 Elektra: Assassin (w, with Bill Sienkiewicz, 1986–1987)
 Elektra Lives Again (w/a, graphic novel, hc, 80 pages, 1991)Marvel Spotlight vol. 2 #8: "Planet Where Time Stood Still!" (a, with Mike W. Barr and Dick Riley, 1980)Marvel Preview #23: "Final Warning" (a, with Lynn Graeme, 1980)Power Man and Iron Fist #76: "Death Scream of the Warhawk!" (a, with Chris Claremont and Mike W. Barr, 1981)Bizarre Adventures #31: "The Philistine" (a, with Dennis O'Neil, 1982)Fantastic Four Roast (a, with Fred Hembeck, among other artists, one-shot, 1982)Wolverine #1–4 (a, with Chris Claremont, 1982) collected as Wolverine (hc, 144 pages, 2007, ; tpb, 2009)Incredible Hulk Annual #11: "Unus Unchained" (a, with Mary Jo Duffy, 1981)Marvel Fanfare #18: "Home Fires!" (a, with Roger Stern, 1984)Sensational She-Hulk #50: "He's Dead?!" (a, with John Byrne, among other artists, 1993)

Dark Horse ComicsThe Life and Times of Martha Washington in the Twenty-First Century (hc, 600 pages, 2009) collects:Give Me Liberty (w, with Dave Gibbons, 1990–1991) also collected as Give Me Liberty (tpb, 216 pages, 1992)Martha Washington Goes to War #1–5 (w, with Dave Gibbons, 1994) also collected as MWGTW (tpb, 144 pages, 1996)Happy Birthday, Martha Washington (w, with Dave Gibbons, one-shot, 1995)Martha Washington Stranded in Space (w, with Dave Gibbons, one-shot, 1995)Martha Washington Saves the World #1–3 (w, with Dave Gibbons, 1997–1998) also collected as MWSTW (tpb, 112 pages, 1999)Martha Washington Dies: "2095" (w, with Dave Gibbons, one-shot, 2007)Hard Boiled (w, with Geof Darrow, 1990–1992) collected as Hard Boiled (tpb, 128 pages, 1993)Sin City (w/a):Sin City (tpb, 208 pages, 1993) collects:
 "Episode 1" (in Dark Horse Presents 5th Anniversary Special, 1991)
 "Episodes 2–13" (in Dark Horse Presents #51–62, 1991–1992)A Dame to Kill for (tpb, 208 pages, 1994) collects:
 A Dame to Kill for #1–6 (1993–1994)The Big Fat Kill (tpb, 184 pages, 1996) collects:
 The Big Fat Kill #1–5 (1994–1995)That Yellow Bastard (tpb, 240 pages, 1997) collects:That Yellow Bastard #1–6 (1996)Family Values (graphic novel, tpb, 128 pages, 1997)Booze, Broads, & Bullets (tpb, 160 pages, 1998) collects:
 "Just Another Saturday Night" (in Sin City #1/2, 1997)
 "Fat Man and Little Boy" (in San Diego Comic Con Comics #4, 1995)
 "The Customer is Always Right" (in San Diego Comic Con Comics #2, 1992)
 Silent Night (one-shot, 1995)
 "And Behind Door Number Three?" (in The Babe Wore Red and Other Stories one-shot, 1994)
 "Blue Eyes" (in Lost, Lonely, & Lethal one-shot, 1996)
 "Rats" (in Lost, Lonely, & Lethal one-shot, 1996)
 "Daddy's Little Girl" (in A Decade of Dark Horse #1, 1996)
 Sex & Violence (one-shot, 1997)
 "The Babe Wore Red" (in The Babe Wore Red and Other Stories one-shot, 1994)Hell and Back (tpb, 312 pages, 2001) collects:
 Hell and Back, a Sin City Love Story #1–9 (1999–2000)RoboCop vs. The Terminator (w, with Walt Simonson, 1992)Madman Comics #6–7 (w, with Mike Allred, 1995) collected in Madman Volume 2 (tpb, 456 pages, 2007)The Big Guy and Rusty the Boy Robot #1–2 (w, with Geof Darrow, 1995) collected as TBG and RtBR (tpb, 80 pages, 1996)Dark Horse Presents (w/a):
 "Lance Blastoff!" (in #100-1, 1995)
 "Lance Blastoff, America's Favourite Hero!" (in #114, 1996)300 (w/a, 1998) collected as 300 (hc, 88 pages, 2000, ; tpb, 2002)Dark Horse Maverick 2000: "Mercy!" (w/a, anthology one-shot, 2000)9-11: Artists Respond, Volume One: "Untitled" (w/a, graphic novel, tpb, 196 pages, 2002)Dark Horse Maverick: Happy Endings: "The End" (w/a, anthology graphic novel, tpb, 96 pages, 2002)Autobiografix: "Man with Pen in Head" (w/a, anthology graphic novel, tpb, 104 pages, 2003)Usagi Yojimbo #100 (w/a, among others, 2009) collected in UY: Bridge of Tears (hc, 248 pages, 2009, ; tpb, 2009)Xerxes: The Fall of the House of Darius and the Rise of Alexander (w/a, 2018)

Other publishersMs. Tree #1–4: "Frank Miller's Famous Detective Pin-Up" (w/a, Eclipse, 1983)Pilote & Charlie #27: "The Chase" (w/a, Dargaud, 1988)Strip AIDS U.S.A.: "Robohomophobe!" (w/a, anthology graphic novel, tpb, 140 pages, Last Gasp, 1988)AARGH! #1: "The Future of Law Enforcement" (w/a, Mad Love, 1988)Spawn (w, Image):
 "Home Story" (with Todd McFarlane, in #11, 1993) collected in Spawn: Dark Discoveries (tpb, 120 pages, 1997)
 Spawn/Batman (with Todd McFarlane, one-shot, 1994)Bad Boy (w, with Simon Bisley, Oni Press, one-shot, 1997)Holy Terror (w/a, graphic novel, hc, 120 pages, Legendary Comics, 2011)

Cover workMarvel Premiere #49, 53–54, 58 (Marvel, 1979–1981)Marvel Spotlight #2, 5, 7 (Marvel, 1979–1980)Uncanny X-Men Annual #3 (Marvel, 1979)Marvel Super Special #14 (Marvel, 1979)ROM Spaceknight #1, 3, 17–18 (Marvel, 1979–1981)The Avengers #193 (Marvel, 1980)Captain America #241, 245, 255, Annual #5 (Marvel, 1980–1981)The Amazing Spider-Man #203, 218–219 (Marvel, 1980–1981)Marvel Team-Up #95, 99, 102, 106, Annual #3 (Marvel, 1980–1981)Star Trek #5, 10 (Marvel, 1980–1981)The Spectacular Spider-Man #46, 48, 50–52, 54–57, 60 (Marvel, 1980–1981)Spider-Woman #31–32 (Marvel, 1980)Power Man and Iron Fist #66, 68, 70–74 (Marvel, 1980–1981)Machine Man #19 (Marvel, 1981)Doctor Strange #46 (Marvel, 1981)Star Wars #47 (Marvel, 1981)The Incredible Hulk #258, 261, 264, 268 (Marvel, 1981–1982)Micronauts #31 (Marvel, 1981)Moon Knight #9, 12, 15, 27 (Marvel, 1981)What If? #27 (Marvel, 1981)Ghost Rider #59 (Marvel, 1981)Amazing Heroes #4, 25, 69 (Fantagraphics Books, 1981–1985)Marvel Fanfare #1 (Marvel, 1982)World's Finest Comics #285 (DC Comics, 1982)Wonder Woman #298 (DC Comics, 1982)Spider-Man and Daredevil Special Edition (Marvel, 1984)The New Adventures of Superboy #51 (cover, 1984)Batman and the Outsiders Annual #1 (cover, 1984)Destroyer Duck #7 (Eclipse, 1984)Superman: The Secret Years #1–4 (DC Comics, 1985)'Mazing Man #12 (DC Comics, 1986)Anything Goes! #2 (Fantagraphics Books, 1986)Lone Wolf and Cub #1–12 (First Comics, 1987–1988)Death Rattle #18 (Kitchen Sink, 1988)Eternal Warrior #1 (Valiant, 1992)Archer & Armstrong #1 (Valiant, 1992)Magnus, Robot Fighter #15 (Valiant, 1992)X-O Manowar #7 (Valiant, 1992)Shadowman #4 (Valiant, 1992)Rai #6 (Valiant, 1992)Harbinger #8 (Valiant, 1992)Solar, Man of the Atom #12 (Valiant, 1992)Comics' Greatest World: Arcadia #1 (Dark Horse, 1993)John Byrne's Next Men #17 (Dark Horse, 1993)Marvel Age #127 (Marvel, 1993)Comics' Greatest World: Vortex #4 (Dark Horse, 1993)Zorro #1 (Topps, 1993)X: One Shot to the Head #4 (Dark Horse, 1994)Medal of Honor #4 (Dark Horse, 1995)Mickey Spillane's Mike Danger #1 (Tekno Comix, 1995)Prophet #2 (Extreme Studios, 1995)X #18–22 (Dark Horse, 1995–1996)G.I. Joe #1 (Dark Horse, 1995)Batman Black and White #2 (DC Comics, 1996)Dark Horse Presents #115 (Dark Horse, 1996)Heavy Metal #183 (HM Communications, 1999)Bone #38 (Cartoon Books, 2000)Spawn #100 (Image, 2000)Green Lantern/Superman: Legend of the Green Flame #1 (DC Comics, 2000)Dark Horse Maverick 2001 (Dark Horse, 2001)The Escapists #1 (Dark Horse, 2006)Jurassic Park #1 (IDW Publishing, 2010)Dark Horse Presents #1 (Dark Horse, 2011)The Creep #0 (Dark Horse, 2012)Detective Comics vol. 2, #27 (variant) (DC Comics, 2014)Moonshine #1 (image, 2016)Shaolin Cowboy: Who'll Stop the Reign'' #1 (Dark Horse, 2017)

Filmography

Films

Television

References

External links

 
 
 
 The Complete Works of Frank Miller
 
 Frank Miller at the Unofficial Handbook of Marvel Comics Creators
 
 

1957 births
American comics artists
American comics writers
American graphic novelists
American libertarians
American male novelists
American people of Irish descent
Artists from Maryland
Artists from Vermont
Bob Clampett Humanitarian Award winners
Eisner Award winners for Best Penciller/Inker or Penciller/Inker Team
Eisner Award winners for Best Writer/Artist
Film directors from Maryland
Inkpot Award winners
Living people
Marvel Comics people
DC Comics people
Novelists from Maryland
Novelists from Vermont
People from Montpelier, Vermont
People from Olney, Maryland
Will Eisner Award Hall of Fame inductees
Writers who illustrated their own writing
Film directors from Vermont
American Noir writers